In Greek mythology, Thelxion was the Argive companion of Telchin. Along with his companion, he planned a conspiracy against Apis, the son of Phoroneus, and finally the two killed him. They were in turn slain by Argus Panoptes.

Note

References 

 Apollodorus, The Library with an English Translation by Sir James George Frazer, F.B.A., F.R.S. in 2 Volumes, Cambridge, MA, Harvard University Press; London, William Heinemann Ltd. 1921. ISBN 0-674-99135-4. Online version at the Perseus Digital Library. Greek text available from the same website.

Argive characters in Greek mythology
Mythology of Argolis